Panch Pallava (literally "five leaves") is a ritual assortment of five different leaves used as a devak (totem) by the Maratha culture in India.

Among those clans holding the panch pallava as a devak, it is used ritually for marriages, funerals, and other important rites.

These five leaves used are generally from trees esteemed in Hindu belief, such as the kalamb, rui, agada, and umbar.  The specific assortment varies by locality and availability.

Maratha clans using the panch pallava as their clan devak include: Bhoite, Bhonsale, Bagawe, Dalvi, Dharmaraj, Devkante, Devpunje, Gavhane, Gangaik, Raje Ghatge or Raje Ghadge, Harphale, Kale, Liman, Shisode, Surve, phadtare, Shirsagr, Zaware and their sub clans.

Sources

Maráthas and Dekhani Musalmáns: Handbooks for the Indian Army. By R. M. Betham. Published by Asian Educational Services, 1996. , . Page 153
Census of India, 1901. India. Census Commissioner. Printed at the Rajputana Mission Press, 1903.  V. 1 pg. 99. 

Marathi terms
Indian culture